Scientific consensus is the generally held judgment, position, and opinion of the majority or the supermajority of scientists in a particular field of study at any particular time.

Consensus is achieved through scholarly communication at conferences, the publication process, replication of reproducible results by others, scholarly debate, and peer review. A conference meant to create a consensus is termed as a consensus conference. Such measures lead to a situation in which those within the discipline can often recognize such a consensus where it exists; however, communicating to outsiders that consensus has been reached can be difficult, because the "normal" debates through which science progresses may appear to outsiders as contestation. On occasion, scientific institutes issue position statements intended to communicate a summary of the science from the "inside" to the "outside" of the scientific community, or consensus review articles or surveys may be published. In cases where there is little controversy regarding the subject under study, establishing the consensus can be quite straightforward.

Popular or political debate on subjects that are controversial within the public sphere but not necessarily controversial within the scientific community may invoke scientific consensus: note such topics as evolution, climate change, the safety of genetically modified organisms, or the lack of a link between MMR vaccinations and autism.

Change of consensus over time 

There are many philosophical and historical theories as to how scientific consensus changes over time. Because the history of scientific change is extremely complicated, and because there is a tendency to project "winners" and "losers" onto the past in relation to the current scientific consensus, it is very difficult to come up with accurate and rigorous models for scientific change. This is made exceedingly difficult also in part because each of the various branches of science functions in somewhat different ways with different forms of evidence and experimental approaches.

Most models of scientific change rely on new data produced by scientific experiment. Karl Popper proposed that since no amount of experiments could ever prove a scientific theory, but a single experiment could disprove one, science should be based on falsification. Whilst this forms a logical theory for science, it is in a sense "timeless" and does not necessarily reflect a view on how science should progress over time.

Among the most influential challengers of this approach was Thomas Kuhn, who argued instead that experimental data always provide some data which cannot fit completely into a theory, and that falsification alone did not result in scientific change or an undermining of scientific consensus. He proposed that scientific consensus worked in the form of "paradigms", which were interconnected theories and underlying assumptions about the nature of the theory itself which connected various researchers in a given field. Kuhn argued that only after the accumulation of many "significant" anomalies would scientific consensus enter a period of "crisis". At this point, new theories would be sought out, and eventually one paradigm would triumph over the old one – a series of paradigm shifts rather than a linear progression towards truth. Kuhn's model also emphasized more clearly the social and personal aspects of theory change, demonstrating through historical examples that scientific consensus was never truly a matter of pure logic or pure facts. However, these periods of 'normal' and 'crisis' science are not mutually exclusive. Research shows that these are different modes of practice, more than different historical periods.

Perception and public opinion

Perception of whether a scientific consensus exists on a given issue, and how strong that conception is, has been described as a "gateway belief" upon which other beliefs and then action are based.

Politicization of science 

In public policy debates, the assertion that there exists a consensus of scientists in a particular field is often used as an argument for the validity of a theory and as support for a course of action by those who stand to gain from a policy based on that consensus. Similarly arguments for a lack of scientific consensus are often encouraged by sides who stand to gain from a more ambiguous policy.

For example, the scientific consensus on the causes of global warming is that global surface temperatures have increased in recent decades and that the trend is caused primarily by human-induced emissions of greenhouse gases. The historian of science Naomi Oreskes published an article in Science reporting that a survey of the abstracts of 928 science articles published between 1993 and 2003 showed none which disagreed explicitly with the notion of anthropogenic global warming. In an editorial published in The Washington Post, Oreskes stated that those who opposed these scientific findings are amplifying the normal range of scientific uncertainty about any facts into an appearance that there is a great scientific disagreement, or a lack of scientific consensus. Oreskes's findings were replicated by other methods that require no interpretation.

The theory of evolution through natural selection is also supported by an overwhelming scientific consensus; it is one of the most reliable and empirically tested theories in science. Opponents of evolution claim that there is significant dissent on evolution within the scientific community. The wedge strategy, a plan to promote intelligent design, depended greatly on seeding and building on public perceptions of absence of consensus on evolution.

The inherent uncertainty in science, where theories are never proven but can only be disproven (see falsifiability), poses a problem for politicians, policymakers, lawyers, and business professionals. Where scientific or philosophical questions can often languish in uncertainty for decades within their disciplinary settings, policymakers are faced with the problems of making sound decisions based on the currently available data, even if it is likely not a final form of the "truth". The tricky part is discerning what is close enough to "final truth". For example, social action against smoking probably came too long after science was 'pretty consensual'.

Certain domains, such as the approval of certain technologies for public consumption, can have vast and far-reaching political, economic, and human effects should things run awry with the predictions of scientists. However, insofar as there is an expectation that policy in a given field reflect knowable and pertinent data and well-accepted models of the relationships between observable phenomena, there is little good alternative for policy makers than to rely on so much of what may fairly be called 'the scientific consensus' in guiding policy design and implementation, at least in circumstances where the need for policy intervention is compelling. While science cannot supply 'absolute truth' (or even its complement 'absolute error') its utility is bound up with the capacity to guide policy in the direction of increased public good and away from public harm. Seen in this way, the demand that policy rely only on what is proven to be "scientific truth" would be a prescription for policy paralysis and amount in practice to advocacy of acceptance of all of the quantified and unquantified costs and risks associated with policy inaction.

No part of policy formation on the basis of the ostensible scientific consensus precludes persistent review either of the relevant scientific consensus or the tangible results of policy. Indeed, the same reasons that drove reliance upon the consensus drives the continued evaluation of this reliance over time – and adjusting policy as needed.

See also 

 Argument from authority
 Consensus decision-making
 Consensus reality
 Fringe theory
 Medical consensus
 Mertonian norms
 Paradigm
 Scientific consensus on climate change
 Status quaestionis

Notes 

Heuristics
Philosophy of science
Consensus